Arthur Leslie Robinson (born 17 August 1946 in Brompton, Hambleton, Yorkshire, England) is an English first-class cricketer, who played eighty four first-class matches for Yorkshire County Cricket Club between 1971 and 1977. He also played in 92 List A one day matches.

Robinson is a left arm fast medium bowler, who took 196 wickets at 25.13, with a best of 6 for 61 against Surrey. He took five wickets in an innings seven times.  A left-handed tail end batsman, he scored 365 runs at 9.60, with a best of 30 not out against Glamorgan.  Robinson took 48 catches in the field.

He took 105 wickets in one day cricket at 24.64, with a best of 4 for 25 against Surrey.  Robinson scored 128 runs at 7.52, with a highest of 18 not out against Lancashire, and he took 15 catches.

References

External links
Cricinfo Profile

1946 births
Living people
English cricketers
Yorkshire cricketers
Cricketers from Scarborough, North Yorkshire
English cricketers of 1969 to 2000